This is a list of public holidays in Afghanistan.

References

External links
 National Holidays in Afghanistan

 
Afghanistan
Holidays